Jean Patton (born 1932) is an American track and field sprinter who competed in the 100-meter dash and 200-meter dash. She was a three-time national champion, winning the women's 100 m in 1949 and 1950, before a 200 m title in 1951.

She competed at one major international tournament for the United States, the 1951 Pan American Games, where she excelled with gold medals in the 200 m and 4 × 100 metres relay (alongside Nell Jackson, Dolores Dwyer and Janet Moreau), as well as a silver medal in the 100 m behind Peru's Julia Sánchez.

An African-American, she attended Tennessee State College and competed for the institution athletically.

National titles
USA Outdoor Track and Field Championships
100 m: 1949, 1950
200 m: 1951

See also
List of 100 metres national champions (women)

References

Living people
1932 births
Track and field athletes from Tennessee
American female sprinters
Pan American Games track and field athletes for the United States
Pan American Games gold medalists for the United States
Pan American Games medalists in athletics (track and field)
Athletes (track and field) at the 1951 Pan American Games
African-American female track and field athletes
Tennessee State Lady Tigers track and field athletes
USA Outdoor Track and Field Championships winners
Medalists at the 1951 Pan American Games
21st-century African-American people
21st-century African-American women
20th-century African-American sportspeople
20th-century African-American women